Fosbretabulin (also known as combretastatin A-4 phosphate or CA4P) is a microtubule destabilizing experimental drug, a type of vascular-targeting agent, a drug designed to damage the vasculature (blood vessels) of cancer tumours causing central necrosis. It is a derivative of combretastatin.  It is formulated as the salts fosbretabulin disodium and fosbretabulin tromethamine.

Fosbretabulin is a prodrug. In vivo, it is dephosphorylated to its active metabolite, combretastatin A-4.

In July 2007, the pharmaceutical company OXiGENE initiated a 180-patient phase III clinical trial of fosbretabulin in combination with carboplatin for the treatment of anaplastic thyroid cancer. There is currently no fully FDA approved treatment for this form of cancer.  By 2017, it had completed multiple clinical trials (e.g. for solid tumours, non-small cell lung cancer) with more in progress.

See also
 Combretastatin, e.g. for the chemical synthesis

References

Prodrugs
Experimental cancer drugs
Phosphate esters